Daniel Hristov (born 23 January 1975 in Kazanlak) is a Bulgarian retired football defender. He is currently the assistant coach at Greater Lowell United FC in Lowell, MA under Head Coach Jason Moore.

Club Playing Honours
Neftochimic Burgas
 Bulgarian Cup: runner-up 2000

References

1975 births
Living people
Bulgarian footballers
PFC Velbazhd Kyustendil players
FC Chernomorets Burgas players
Neftochimic Burgas players
PFC Vidima-Rakovski Sevlievo players
PFC Rodopa Smolyan players
First Professional Football League (Bulgaria) players
Association football defenders
People from Kazanlak